This is a list of supermarket chains in Greece.

Convenience stores

Supermarkets

Hypermarkets

Cash and carry

Defunct supermarket chains
Aldi - German discounter  
Arvanitidis
Bonita City, 
Bonita 
Marinopoulos
Carrefour
Carrefour Marinopoulos
Carrefour Express
Dia
Plus - German owned
Veropoulos
Atlantik

See also

 List of supermarket chains in Europe
 List of supermarket chains
List of supermarket chains in Motta

References

Supermarkets
Greece
Supermarkets